The Journal of Management and Business Administration. Central Europe is a quarterly peer-reviewed academic journal published by Kozminski University. It covers all aspects of management studies and publishes both empirical and theoretical research articles in Polish and English.  It was established in 1993 as Master of Business Administration and obtained its current title in 2011. The current editor-in-chief is Paweł Korzyński (Kozminski University).

Abstracting and indexing 
Journal of Management and Business Administration. Central Europe is abstracted and indexed in the Central and Eastern European Online Library and Proquest IBSS.

External links 
 

Business and management journals
Multilingual journals
Publications established in 1993
Quarterly journals
Academic journals published in Poland
1993 establishments in Poland